Myrtle Creek Municipal Airport  is a public airport located two miles (3.2 km) southwest of Myrtle Creek in Douglas County, Oregon, United States. It is located on approximately 87.26 acres, and is owned and operated by the City of Myrtle Creek. The airport is bordered by U.S. Interstate 5 to the west and the South Umpqua River.

External links

Airports in Douglas County, Oregon